Tibor Pomper (born 10 October 1977, in Budapest) is a Hungarian football player who played for REAC until the end of 2009, he left REAC to go to Greece. His Greek plans did not come true, currently he is without team.

References

1977 births
Living people
Footballers from Budapest
Hungarian footballers
Ferencvárosi TC footballers
Budapesti VSC footballers
Dunaújváros FC players
Fehérvár FC players
Rákospalotai EAC footballers
Győri ETO FC players
Budapest Honvéd FC players
Association football defenders